The Director General of the European Union Military Staff (DGEUMS) is the head of the European Union Military Staff (EUMS) who also serves as Director of the Military Planning and Conduct Capability (Dir MPCC). This position, which was established in 2001, is held by a three-star general, the current holder is vice admiral Hervé Bléjean, occupied the position since June 2020.

Task
The Director General is responsible for the EUMS' work in providing strategic advice to the High Representative (HR), reporting to the European Union Military Committee (EUMC) - representing member states' Chiefs of Defence - and performing "early warning", situation assessment and strategic planning.
 
Since 2017 DGEUMS has also served as Director of the Military Planning and Conduct Capability (MPCC), and as such assumes the function of the single commander for all non-executive military missions of the European Union (EU), exercising command and control over the current three training Missions and other possible future operations. Presently the MPCC may only run non-executive operations. By the end of 2020 the MPCC will also be capable of running executive operations of up to 2500 troops, i.e. the size of one battle group.

Relation with the rest of the Military Staff, the High Representative and Military Committee

Role in the command and control structure

List of holders

Deputy
DGEUMS is assisted by the Deputy Director General and the Chef of Staff (DDG/COS, a two-star general).

See also

High Representative of the Union for Foreign Affairs and Security Policy
Chairman of the European Union Military Committee
Chairman of the NATO Military Committee
Supreme Allied Commander Europe
Director of the Civilian Planning and Conduct Capability

References

External links

CV of Director General Pulkkinen, Europa.eu